{{Infobox School
|name                   = Bharatiya Vidya Bhavan's Public School, BHEL, Ramachandrapuram
|image             =
|image_size             = 250px
|founder                = Kulapathi K.M. Munshi
|established            = 1977
|motto                  = Ano bhadraha kritavoyantu Viswavatah (sanskrit)
|motto_translation               = Let noble thoughts come to us from every side - Rigveda, 1-89-i
|type                   = Public School
|faculty                = 132
|principal              = Smt Malladi Uma Shastry
|students               = 3621 (2018-19)
|location               = Medak, Hyderabad
|state                  = Telangana
|country                = India
|campus                 = Urban
|area                   = 12 acres approx
|nickname               = Bhavanites
|affiliations           = CBSE, High-School
|website                = http://bhavansbhelhyd.com
|footnotes              = Let noble thoughts come to us from every sideas on 1 July 2010.
}}

Bharatiya Vidya Bhavan's Public School- BHEL (BVBPS BHEL-RCPuram) is a co-educational high school with enrollment from Nursery (Pre-School) to X Standard. It is affiliated to the Central Board of Secondary Education (CBSE), India and is located in the Bharat Heavy Electricals Limited (BHEL) township. Its parent body is the Bharatiya Vidya Bhavan educational trust founded by Kulapathi Dr. K.M. Munshi in 1938.

The BHEL campus, located in the Medak District  was started at the request of the BHEL Management to serve their children and others from the neighbourhood. It started classes on 18 July 1977 with 475 students enrolled.

The school follows a traditional chanting of Sanskrit slokas.
Every Friday there is a Sarva Dharma Prayer'', translated as All Faith Prayer. 

Prayer: https://web.archive.org/web/20110913215343/http://www.bhavanites.org/FILES/prayer.htm

Inspired by how alumni groups work in US and UK, the Class of 1992 aims to connect back with the school leveraging social media (especially Facebook) as an enabler.

References

External links 
 http://bhavansbhelhyd.com

Educational institutions established in 1977
Private schools in Hyderabad, India
Schools affiliated with the Bharatiya Vidya Bhavan
1977 establishments in Andhra Pradesh